Jeremy Awori, is a Kenyan businessman and corporate executive who was appointed as Group CEO and director of Ecobank Transnational, effective 1 November 2022. He replaced Ade Ayeyemi, from Nigeria, who retired, having attained the retirement of age of 60. Awori is based in Lomé, Togo.

Before that, up until 31 October 2022, he served as the managing director and chief executive officer of Absa Bank Kenya (formerly Barclays Bank of Kenya), since June 2013. Before that, from 2008 until 2013, he was the CEO of Standard Chartered Tanzania. He was based in Nairobi, Kenya's capital city.

Background and education
Awori is a Kenyan national, born circa 1971. His father was an engineer and a Kenyan by birth. His mother was British and a lawyer. He has two siblings, one brother and one sister.

He was educated at St. Mary's School, Nairobi, for his elementary and secondary education. In 1989, he was admitted to the University of Manchester in the United Kingdom, graduating in 1991 with a Bachelor of Science degree in Pharmacy. Later in the 1990s, he graduated from McGill University, in Canada with a Master of Business Administration degree, focusing on Finance and International Business.

Career
After his first degree, he practiced as a pharmacist in the United Kingdom, before he moved to Canada for his second degree.

After his MBA, he was hired by Standard Chartered Bank of Canada. His employer was impressed by the work he did there, leading to Jeremy's hiring as the "head of Retail Banking, Standard Chartered Bank Kenya, at the age of 28 years". He concurrently served on the Board of Standard Chartered Kenya at that time.

From there, he was transferred to the United Arab Emirates as the head of consumer banking at Standard Chartered United Arab Emirates. After three years in that position, he was promoted to Regional Sales Director, Middle East, South Asia & Africa, based in the United Arab Emirates, serving in that role for two years. In 2008, he was appointed CEO and managing director of Standard Chartered Tanzania, serving there for five years.

In 2013, he left Standard Chartered and transferred to Barclays Bank, taking up a new appointment as CEO of Barclays Bank Kenya (BBK). In 2020, BBK whose shares of stock are listed on the Nairobi Stock Exchange, rebranded to Absa Bank Kenya, with Jeremy Awori at the helm.

He retired from Absa Bank Kenya on 31 October 2022 and took up a new position at Ecobank Transnational as director and Group CEO, based in Lome, Togo.

Family
Awori is a married man.

Other considerations
He sits on the board of directors of Kenya Private Sector Alliance (KEPSA). He is also a member of the governing council of the Kenya Bankers Association (KBA) and previously served as the chairman of KBA.

References

External links
 Personal Profile At LinkedIn.com

Living people
1971 births
Kenyan businesspeople
Alumni of the University of Manchester
McGill University alumni
Kenyan business executives
Kenyan chief executives
Absa people